Khalil Joseph Nepomuceno Ramos (born January 22, 1996) is a Filipino actor and singer.

In July 2011, Ramos won second place on Pilipinas Got Talent, a reality talent show in ABS-CBN and became a recording artist under Star Magic. In 2012, he was cast in his first teleserye project, Princess and I, top-billing with Kathryn Bernardo, Daniel Padilla and Enrique Gil.

From 2013 to 2016, he appeared in supporting roles in a string of films such as She's Dating the Gangster, Kid Kulafu, A Second Chance, Honor Thy Father and Everything About Her. His first starring role came as Felix Salonga in the 2016 critically acclaimed coming-of-age film 2 Cool 2 Be 4gotten. He has since been cast in recurring roles the drama A Love to Last (2017) and fantasy series La Luna Sangre (2017–18).

He also starred in indie films such as Riding in Tandem opposite Jason Abalos, released in select cinemas in the Philippines from October 13–19, 2017. It was announced that he was cast in thriller drama Kasunduan which also stars Joey Marquez, Joem Bascon and Ejay Falcon, set to be released in 2018.

He transferred to GMA Network's talent agency, Sparkle GMA Artist Center, in 2020 after 9 years with Star Magic.

Personal life
Khalil Joseph Nepomuceno Ramos was born January 22, 1996, in Parañaque City, Philippines to parents Lito Ramos and Tessa Nepomuceno, who are entrepreneurs. As of 2011, he was in his third year at Colegio San Agustin-Makati.

Khalil was inspired by his father, who started to train him to be a singer at the age of 5. His talent were influenced by Michael Jackson, David Cook, Journey, and John Lennon. However, his musical taste matured from the influences
by Queen, Aerosmith, and The Beatles while growing up. In 2011 he trained with Jay Glorioso of the UP Diliman College of Music and Juilliard School of Performing Arts.

Discography

Album

Music videos

Music video appearances

Singles

Covers
Khalil Ramos became popular recently due to his viral cover songs. Most of these covers are courtesy of his guesting in the radio program The Roadshow on Wish 107.5 last 2016. Some of these covers include the Iris which had already reached a million views and counting. Due to his popularity, the radio station took him as a guest again for the second time last January 2017. Last September 2019, Ramos, together with partner Gabbi Garcia, performed their rendition of Pagtingin by Ben&Ben which had reached nearly 1.5 million views in YouTube.

Filmography

Films

He has already completed filming two independent films set to be released this 2017, the thriller drama Kasunduan co-starring Ejay Falcon and Joey Marquez and the action thriller Riding in Tandem with Jason Abalos.

Television series

 1 Khalil Ramos guestings and appearances on Talent & Reality Game Shows
 2 Khalil Ramos guestings and appearances on Variety & Talk Shows

Accolades

References

External links
 Khalil Ramos on Star Magic
 Khalil Ramos on Star Records
 Khalil Ramos on ASAP Artists
 
 

1996 births
Filipino male television actors
21st-century Filipino male singers
Living people
Participants in Philippine reality television series
ABS-CBN personalities
GMA Network personalities
21st-century Filipino male actors
Pilipinas Got Talent contestants
Star Music artists
People from Parañaque
Male actors from Metro Manila
Filipino male film actors